Daniel Anthony Hinton (May 24, 1953 – June 1, 1994) was a Canadian former professional ice hockey forward.  He was drafted by the Chicago Black Hawks in the fifth round, 77th overall, of the 1973 NHL Amateur Draft.  He was also drafted by the Houston Aeros in the seventh round, 87th overall, of the 1973 WHA Amateur Draft; however, he never played in the World Hockey Association.  Hinton played fourteen National Hockey League games with the Black Hawks in the 1976–77 season, scoring no points.

Career statistics

External links

1953 births
1994 deaths
Canadian ice hockey forwards
Chicago Blackhawks draft picks
Chicago Blackhawks players
Dallas Black Hawks players
Houston Aeros draft picks
Ice hockey people from Toronto
Kitchener Rangers players
New Brunswick Hawks players
Sault Ste. Marie Greyhounds players